Cabrini–Green was a neighborhood on the Near North Side of Chicago, Illinois.

The neighborhood was named after the Frances Cabrini Rowhouses and William Green Homes that once took up most of the area. The buildings were overrun with crime and fell into disrepair. Most of the buildings have been razed, and the entire neighborhood is being redeveloped into a combination of mid-rise buildings and row houses. The stated goal for the redevelopment is to create a mixed-income neighborhood with some units reserved for public housing tenants.

Parks
Seward Park
Durso Park

Education
Jenner (PreK-8)

Defunct
Cabrini Extension North (1958)
Cabrini Extension South (1958)
William Green Homes (1962)

Present
Frances Cabrini Rowhouses (1942)
Parkside of Old Town (2011)
The Larrabee

References

Neighborhoods in Chicago
Populated places established in 1942
1942 establishments in Illinois